The International Paderborn Computer Chess Championship was an annual chess tournament for computer chess programs held from 1991 until 2007. It was organized by the University of Paderborn. The fifth edition in 1995 was also the 13th edition of the World Microcomputer Chess Championship.

Champions
{| class="sortable wikitable"
! # !! Year !! Program !! Champion
|-
| 1||1991||Zugzwang||Rainer Feldmann, Peter Mysliwietz, Heiner Matthias
|-
| 2||1992||Zugzwang||Rainer Feldmann, Peter Mysliwietz, Heiner Matthias
|-
| 3||1993||Bobby||Hans-Joachim Kraas, Günther Schrüfer
|-
| 4||1994||Schach 3.0||Matthias Engelbach, Thomas Kreitmair
|-
| 5||1995||MChess Pro 5.0||Martin Hirsch
|-
| 6||1997||Zugzwang||Rainer Feldmann, Peter Mysliwietz, Heiner Matthias
|-
| 7||1998||Nimzo98||Christian Donninger
|-
| 8||1999||P.ConNerS  ||Ulf Lorenz
|-
| 9||2000||Shredder||Stefan Meyer-Kahlen
|-
| 10||2001||Shredder||Stefan Meyer-Kahlen
|-
| 11||2002||Shredder||Stefan Meyer-Kahlen
|-
| 12||2003||Fritz||Frans Morsch, Mathias Feist
|-
| 13||2004||Hydra||Christian Donninger, Alex Kure, Ulf Lorenz
|-
| 14||2005||Hydra||Christian Donninger, Alex Kure, Ulf Lorenz
|-
| 15||2005||Rybka||Vasik Rajlich
|-
| 16||2006||Rybka||Vasik Rajlich
|-
| 17||2007||HIARCS||Mark Uniacke
|}

References
 Complete results and crosstables the CSVN:  
 Reports from Chessbase: 2002, 2003 and 2004
 Results from TWIC: 2003, 2006
 Program info from the ICGA: 
 Official homepage   

Computer chess competitions